The American Broadcasting Company (ABC) is an American broadcast television television network owned by the Disney Media Networks subsidiary of The Walt Disney Company, which originated in 1927 as the NBC Blue radio network, and five years after its 1942 divorce from NBC and purchase by Edward J. Noble (adopting its current name the following year), expanded into television in April 1948. The network currently has eight owned-and-operated stations, and current affiliation agreements with 242 other television stations.

This article is a listing of current ABC affiliates in the continental United States and U.S. possessions (including subchannel affiliates, satellite stations and select low-power translators), arranged alphabetically by state, and based on the station's city of license, and followed in parentheses by the Designated Market Area if it differs from the city of license. There are links to and articles on each of the stations, describing their histories, local programming and technical information, such as broadcast frequencies.

The station's advertised channel number follows the call letters. In most cases, this is their virtual channel (PSIP) number.

Stations listed in boldface are owned and operated by ABC through its subsidiary ABC Owned Television Stations.

United States

Alabama
 Anniston – WGWW-DT2 40.2 (simulcast of WBMA-LD)
 Birmingham – WBMA-LD 58 / WABM-DT2 68.2
 Dothan – WDHN 18
 Huntsville – WAAY-TV 31
 Montgomery – WNCF 32
 Tuscaloosa – WDBB-DT2 17.2 (satellite of WBMA-LD)

Alaska
Some ABC programming is broadcast on the Alaska Rural Communications Service (ARCS).
 Anchorage – KYUR 13
 Fairbanks – KATN 2
 Juneau – KJUD 8

Arizona
 Phoenix – KNXV-TV 15
 Tucson – KGUN-TV 9

Arkansas
 Fayetteville – KHOG-TV 29 (satellite of KHBS)
 Fort Smith – KHBS 40
 Jonesboro – KAIT 8
 Little Rock – KATV 7

California
 Arcata (Eureka) – KAEF-TV 23 (semi-satellite of KRCR-TV)
 Bakersfield – KERO-TV 23
 El Centro (Yuma, Arizona) – KECY-DT2 9.2
 Fresno – KFSN-TV 30
 Los Angeles – KABC-TV 7
 Palm Springs – KESQ-TV 42
 Redding (Chico) – KRCR-TV 7
 Sacramento – KXTV 10
 Salinas (Monterey) – KSBW-DT2 8.2
 San Diego – KGTV 10
 San Francisco – KGO-TV 7
 Santa Barbara – KEYT-TV 3

Colorado
 Colorado Springs – KRDO-TV 13
 Denver – KMGH-TV 7
 Grand Junction – KJCT-LP 8

Connecticut
 New Haven (Hartford) – WTNH-TV 8

Delaware
 None; served by WPVI-TV Philadelphia and WMDT Salisbury, MD

District of Columbia
 Washington – WJLA-TV 7

Florida
 Gainesville – WCJB-TV 20
 Miami – WPLG 10
 Naples (Fort Myers) – WZVN-TV 26
 Orange Park (Jacksonville) – WJXX 25
 Orlando – WFTV 9
 Panama City – WMBB 13
 Pensacola (Mobile, Alabama) – WEAR-TV 3
 Sarasota – WWSB 40
 Tallahassee – WTXL-TV 27
 Tampa – WFTS-TV 28
 Tequesta (West Palm Beach) – WPBF 25

Georgia
 Albany – WALB-DT2 10.2
 Atlanta – WSB-TV 2
 Augusta – WJBF 6
 Columbus – WTVM 9
 Macon – WGXA-DT2 24.2
 Savannah – WJCL 22

Hawaii
 Hilo – KHVO-TV 4 (satellite of KITV)
 Honolulu – KITV 4
 Wailuku – KMAU-TV 4 (satellite of KITV)

Idaho
 Idaho Falls (Pocatello) – KIFI-TV 8
 Nampa (Boise) – KIVI-TV 6
 Twin Falls – KSAW-LD 6 (satellite of KIVI)

Illinois
 Champaign – WICD 15 (semi-satellite of WICS)
 Chicago – WLS-TV 7
 Harrisburg (Paducah, Kentucky) – WSIL-TV 3
 Moline (Davenport, Iowa) (Quad Cities) – WQAD-TV 8
 Peoria – WEEK-DT2 25.2
 Rockford – WTVO 17
 Springfield – WICS 20

Indiana
 Evansville – WEHT 25
 Fort Wayne – WPTA 21
 Indianapolis – WRTV 6
 Lafayette – WPBY-LD 35
 South Bend – WBND-LD 57
 Terre Haute – WAWV-TV 38

Iowa
 Ames (Des Moines) – WOI-DT 5
 Cedar Rapids – KCRG-TV 9
 Sioux City – KCAU-TV 9

Kansas
 Colby – KLBY 4 (satellite of KAKE)
 Garden City (Dodge City) – KUPK 13 (satellite of KAKE)
 Great Bend – KGBD-LD 30 (repeater of KAKE)
 Salina – KHDS-LD 51 (repeater of KAKE)
 Topeka – KTKA-TV 49
 Wichita – KAKE 10

Kentucky
 Bowling Green – WBKO-TV 13
 Lexington – WTVQ-DT 36
 Louisville – WHAS-TV 11

Louisiana
 Alexandria – KLAX-TV 31
 Baton Rouge – WBRZ-TV 2
 Lafayette – KATC 3
 Lake Charles – KVHP-DT2 29.2
 Monroe – KNOE-DT2 8.2
 New Orleans – WGNO 26
 Shreveport – KTBS-TV 3

Maine
 Bangor – WVII-TV 7
 Poland Spring (Portland) – WMTW 8

Maryland
 Baltimore – WMAR-TV 2
 Salisbury – WMDT 47

Massachusetts
 Boston – WCVB-TV 5
 New Bedford (Providence, Rhode Island) – WLNE-TV 6
 Springfield – WGGB-TV 40

Michigan
 Alpena – WBKB-DT3 11.3
 Battle Creek – WOTV 41
 Detroit – WXYZ-TV 7
 Flint – WJRT-TV 12
 Grand Rapids – WZZM 13
 Ishpeming (Marquette) – WBUP 10
 Lansing – WLAJ 53
 Sault Ste. Marie – WGTQ 8 (satellite of WGTU)
 Traverse City – WGTU 29

Minnesota
 Alexandria – KSAX-TV 42 (satellite of KSTP-TV)
 Austin (Rochester) – KAAL 6
 Duluth – WDIO-DT 10
 Hibbing – WIRT 13 (satellite of WDIO-DT)
 Redwood Falls – KRWF 43 (satellite of KSTP-TV)
 St. James (Mankato) – K30FN 5 (translator of KSTP-TV)
 Saint Paul (Minneapolis) – KSTP-TV 5

Mississippi
 Biloxi – WLOX 13
 Greenwood – WABG-TV 6
 Jackson – WAPT 16
 Laurel (Hattiesburg) – WDAM-DT2 7.2
 Meridian – WTOK-TV 11
 Tupelo – WTVA-DT2 9.2

Missouri
 Columbia – KMIZ 17
 Hannibal (Quincy, Illinois) – KHQA-TV 7.2
 Joplin – KODE-TV 12
 Kansas City – KMBC-TV 9
 Kirksville (Ottumwa, Iowa) – KTVO 3
 Poplar Bluff – KPOB-TV 15 (satellite of WSIL-TV, Harrisburg, Ill.)
 Saint Joseph – KQTV 2
 Saint Louis – KDNL-TV 30
 Springfield – KSPR-LD 33

Montana
 Billings – KSVI 6
 Bozeman – KWYB-LD 28 (repeater of KWYB)
 Butte – KWYB 18
 Great Falls – KFBB-TV 5
 Helena – KHBB-LD 21 (repeater of KFBB-TV)
 Missoula – KTMF 23

Nebraska
 Hayes Center – KWNB-TV 6 (satellite of KHGI-TV)
 Kearney – KHGI-TV 13
 Lincoln – KLKN 8
 North Platte – KHGI-CD 13 (repeater of KHGI-TV)
 Omaha – KETV 7

Nevada
 Las Vegas – KTNV-TV 13
 Reno – KOLO-TV 8

New Hampshire
 Manchester – WMUR-TV 9

New Jersey
 None; served by WABC-TV New York and WPVI-TV Philadelphia

New Mexico
 Albuquerque – KOAT-TV 7
 Clovis – KVIH-TV 12 (satellite of KVII-TV, Amarillo, Texas)

New York
 Albany – WTEN 10
 Binghamton – WIVT 34
 Buffalo – WKBW-TV 7
 Elmira – WENY-TV 36
 New York City – WABC-TV 7
 Rochester – WHAM-TV 13
 Syracuse – WSYR-TV 9
 Utica – WUTR 20
 Watertown – WWTI 50

North Carolina
 Asheville – WLOS 13
 Charlotte – WSOC-TV 9
 Durham (Raleigh) – WTVD 11
 New Bern (Greenville) – WCTI-TV 12
 Wilmington – WWAY 3
 Winston-Salem (Greensboro) – WXLV-TV 45

North Dakota
 Bismarck – KBMY 17
 Devils Lake (Grand Forks) – WDAZ-TV 8 (semi-satellite of WDAY-TV)
 Fargo – WDAY-TV 6
 Minot – KMCY 14 (semi-satellite of KBMY)

Ohio
 Cincinnati – WCPO-TV 9
 Cleveland – WEWS-TV 5
 Columbus – WSYX 6
 Dayton – WKEF 22
 Lima – WOHL-CD 35 / WPNM-LD 35
 Toledo – WTVG 13
 Youngstown – WYTV 33

Oklahoma
 Ada (Sherman, Texas) – KTEN-DT3 10.3
 Lawton (Wichita Falls, Texas) – KSWO-TV 7
 Oklahoma City – KOCO-TV 5
 Tulsa – KTUL 8

Oregon
 Bend – KOHD 18
 Eugene – KEZI 9
 Klamath Falls – KDKF 31 (satellite of KDRV)
 Medford – KDRV 12
 Portland – KATU 2

Pennsylvania
 Altoona – WATM-TV 23
 Erie – WJET-TV 24
 Harrisburg – WHTM-TV 27
 Johnstown – WWCP-DT2 8.2 (simulcast of WATM-TV)
 Philadelphia – WPVI-TV 6
 Pittsburgh – WTAE-TV 4
 Scranton – WNEP-TV 16

Rhode Island
 None; served by WLNE-TV New Bedford, MA

South Carolina
 Charleston – WCIV-DT2 36.2
 Columbia – WOLO-TV 25
 Florence (Myrtle Beach) – WPDE-TV 15

South Dakota
 Aberdeen – KABY-TV 9 (satellite of KSFY-TV)
 Lead – KHSD-TV 11 (satellite of KOTA-TV)
 Pierre – KPRY-TV 4 (satellite of KSFY-TV)
 Rapid City – KOTA-TV 3
 Sioux Falls – KSFY-TV 13

Tennessee
 Chattanooga – WTVC 9
 Jackson – WBBJ-TV 7
 Johnson City (Tri-Cities, TN-VA) – WJHL-DT2 11.2
 Knoxville – WATE-TV 6
 Memphis – WATN-TV 24
 Nashville – WKRN-TV 2

Texas

 Amarillo – KVII-TV 7
 Austin – KVUE 24
 Beaumont – KBMT 12
 Bryan – KRHD-CD 40 (repeater of KXXV)
 Corpus Christi – KIII 3
 Dallas – WFAA 8
 El Paso – KVIA-TV 7
 Houston – KTRK-TV 13
 Laredo – KGNS-DT2 8.2
 Lubbock – KAMC 28
 Lufkin – KTRE 9 (semi-satellite of KLTV)
 Midland – KMID 2
 San Angelo – KTXE-LP 38 (repeater of KTXS-TV)
 San Antonio – KSAT-TV 12
 Sweetwater (Abilene) – KTXS-TV 12
 Tyler – KLTV 7
 Victoria – KAVU-TV 25
 Waco – KXXV 25
 Weslaco (Rio Grande Valley) – KRGV-TV 5

Utah
 Salt Lake City – KTVX 4

Vermont
 Burlington – WVNY 22

Virginia
 Charlottesville – WVAW-LD 16
 Hampton (Hampton Roads) – WVEC 13
 Harrisonburg – WHSV-TV 3
 Lynchburg (Roanoke) – WSET-TV 13
 Petersburg (Richmond) – WRIC-TV 8

Washington
 Kennewick – KVEW 42 (semi-satellite of KAPP)
 Seattle – KOMO-TV 4
 Spokane – KXLY-TV 4
 Yakima – KAPP 35

West Virginia
 Charleston – WCHS-TV 8
 Clarksburg – WBOY-DT2 12.2
 Oak Hill (Bluefield) – WOAY-TV 4
 Wheeling – WTRF-DT3 7.3

Wisconsin
 Crandon – WMOW-DT2 4.2 (simulcast of WAOW)
 Eagle River – WYOW-TV 34 (satellite of WAOW)
 Eau Claire – WQOW 18
 Green Bay – WBAY-TV 2
 La Crosse – WXOW 19
 Madison – WKOW 27
 Milwaukee – WISN-TV 12
 Wausau – WAOW 9

Wyoming
 Casper – KTWO-TV 2
 Cheyenne – KKTQ-LD 16 (semi-satellite of KTWO-TV)

Elsewhere

Unincorporated territories of the U.S.

Guam
 Tamuning (Hagåtña) – KTGM 14

Northern Mariana Islands
 Saipan – KPPC-LP 7 (repeater of KTGM/Hagåtña, Guam)

Puerto Rico
 Carolina (San Juan) – WRFB 5.1  (repeater of WORA-DT1)
 Mayagüez – WORA-TV 5.1
 San Lorenzo – W29EE-D 5.1 (repeater of WORA-DT1)

U.S. Virgin Islands
 Christiansted – WCVI-TV 23.2

Bermuda
 Hamilton – ZFB-TV 7

See also
 List of ABC television affiliates (table)
 List of former ABC television affiliates
 Lists of ABC television affiliates
 Lists of CBS television affiliates
 Lists of NBC television affiliates

Footnotes

ABC
ABC